The Forever Prisoner is a 2021 documentary film. The film details the treatment of Abu Zubaydah, a Saudi Arabian detainee held at CIA blacksites and later Guantanamo Bay. The film was directed by Alex Gibney.

References

External links
 

2021 documentary films
2021 films
American documentary films
Films directed by Alex Gibney
Documentary films about torture
Documentary films about human rights
Documentary films about the War in Afghanistan (2001–2021)
Guantanamo Bay detention camp
Torture in the United States
2020s English-language films
2020s American films